Raphael John Musto (March 30, 1929 – April 24, 2014) was an American politician from Pennsylvania who served as a Democratic Party member of the U.S. House of Representatives for Pennsylvania's 11th congressional district from 1980 to 1981. He served as a member of the Pennsylvania House of Representatives for the 118th district from 1971 to 1980 and of the Pennsylvania Senate for the 14th district from 1982 until his retirement in 2010.

Early life and education
Musto was born in Pittston, Pennsylvania and graduated from Pittston Township High School. He served in the United States Army from 1951 to 1953 during the Korean War. He graduated from Kings College in Wilkes-Barre in 1971.

Career
When his father, longtime State Representative James Musto, died in 1971, the younger Musto won a special election to fill his seat. He was elected to a full term in 1972 and was reelected three times.

In 1980, longtime Congressman Dan Flood, who had represented  for most of the time since 1945, resigned after being censured for bribery. Musto won a four-way special election for the remainder of Flood's term. He ran for a full term later that year, but was narrowly defeated by Republican challenger James Nelligan, whom Musto had defeated in the special election.

While in Congress, Musto met with undercover FBI agents posing as representatives of a fictitious Middle Eastern Sheik known as the ABSCAM sting operation.  Musto declined an implied bribe from the FBI agents and was never charged in the investigation.

Musto was elected to the state Senate in 1982 and was reelected six times, representing a district consisting of Wilkes-Barre and portions of the Poconos. He did not seek re-election in 2010, choosing instead to retire at the end of his term.

On November 23, 2010, a federal grand jury issued a six-count indictment against Musto, charging him with accepting more than $28,000 from an unnamed company and individual in exchange for his help in obtaining grants and funding. Musto was also charged with accepting $3,000 from another unnamed individual in a separate incident.  Musto denied any wrongdoing.  The trial was delayed multiple times due to Musto's declining health.

Musto was released from a federal medical prison in North Carolina in April 2014.  He had been declared mentally unfit to stand trial and was diagnosed with advanced stage lymph-node cancer while being treated at the prison.  He died at his home in Pittston on April 24  and is interred at Pittston City Cemetery.

The criminal case against him was dismissed posthumously on April 30, 2014, by Federal Judge A. Richard Caputo.

References

External links

Follow the Money - Raphael J. Musto
2006 2004 2002 2000 1998 campaign contributions

1929 births
2014 deaths
20th-century American politicians
Abscam
United States Army personnel of the Korean War
Burials in Pennsylvania
Deaths from cancer in Pennsylvania
People from Pittston, Pennsylvania
Military personnel from Pennsylvania
Democratic Party Pennsylvania state senators
Democratic Party members of the Pennsylvania House of Representatives
United States Army soldiers
King's College (Pennsylvania) alumni
Democratic Party members of the United States House of Representatives from Pennsylvania